The Furna Feia National Park is a national park in the state of Rio Grande do Norte, Brazil that contains a large cave system.

History

Furna Feia park is the first national park in Rio Grande do Norte.
Creation of the park was stalled by resistance from mining operations in the area, mainly limestone for use in making cement.
As a compromise  of the planned park where mining applications had been filed were given up, removing the main obstacle.
The park was created on 5 June 2012, and is administered by the Chico Mendes Institute for Biodiversity Conservation (ICMBio).
President Dilma Rousseff announced creation of the park on World Environment Day.

Location

The park lies in the municipalities of Baraúna and Mossoró in the state of Rio Grande do Norte.
Furna Feia (Ugly Cavern) is the largest cave complex in the state of Rio Grande do Norte.
So far more than 200 caves have been found.
The park holds about 105 species of plants and 135 species of animals, some of which are endangered.
Eleven species of troglobite invertebrates have been found, all new to science.

Conservation

The parks is classed as IUCN protected area category II (national park).
Its goals are to preserve the speleological complex of Furna Feia and the biodiversity associated with the Caatinga biome, to carry out scientific research and to develop educational activities, environmental interpretation, outdoors recreation and eco-tourism.
ICMBio works with the local people to try to prevent actions that degrade the natural resources of the park, which include hunting, illegal removal of timber and destructive visits to the caves, particularly the main cave.
The agency has established a fire brigade to help prevent forest fires in the conservation unit.

References

Sources

National parks of Brazil
Protected areas of Rio Grande do Norte
2012 establishments in Brazil
Protected areas established in 2012
Caatinga